The 2016–17 George Mason Patriots Men's basketball team represented George Mason University during the 2016–17 NCAA Division I men's basketball season. This was the 51st season for the program. They were coached by second-year coach Dave Paulsen as members of the Atlantic 10 Conference. They play their home games at EagleBank Arena in Fairfax, Virginia. They finished the season 20–14, 9–9 in A-10 play to finish in a tie for seventh place. In the A-10 tournament, they defeated Fordham in the second round before losing to VCU in the quarterfinals. They received an invitation to the College Basketball Invitational where they lost in the first round to Loyola (MD).

Previous season
The Patriots finished the 2015–16 season with a record of 11–21, 5–13 in A–10 play to finish in a tie for 12th place. In the A–10 Tournament, the Patriots were defeated by Saint Louis, 83–78 in the first round.

Offseason

Departures

2016 recruiting class
The following is a list of players signed for the 2017–18 season:

Honors and awards 
Atlantic 10 All-Conference 2nd Team
 Marquise Moore

Atlantic 10 Most Improved Player
 Marquise Moore

Atlantic 10 Player of the Week
 Marquise Moore - Dec. 12
 Marquise Moore - Dec. 26
 Marquise Moore - Jan. 23
 Otis Livingston II - Feb. 6

Roster

Player statistics

Schedule and results

|-
!colspan=12 style=| Non-conference regular season

|-
!colspan=12 style=|A-10 regular season

|-
!colspan=12 style=|A-10 tournament

|-
!colspan=12 style=|CBI

See also
2016–17 George Mason Patriots women's basketball team

References

George Mason Patriots men's basketball seasons
George Mason
George Mason
George Mason men's basketball
George Mason